QMF can refer to:
 Quadrature mirror filter, a class of filters in digital signal processing
 Quadrupole mass filter, a type of mass spectrometer
 Quality management framework or quality management system
 Queensland Music Festival
 IBM Query Management Facility, a programming language